Beizhen is a city in west-central Liaoning province of Northeast China. It is under the administration of Jinzhou City.

History

In 1123, the Jin Dynasty set Guangning County in nowadays Beizhen. In Ming Dynasty, the town of Guangning became a base of the Ming troops in Liaotung and a prosperous border trading center. In 1913, the name was changed to Beizhen, which is an alternative name of the Yiwulü Mountain, literally meaning "the guarding mountain of the North".
In 1995, Beizhen County became Beining City, the name of which is later changed to the current name.

Administrative divisions

There are three subdistricts, 14 towns, and six townships under the city's administration.

Subdistricts:
Beizhen Subdistrict, Guangning Subdistrict, Guanyin'ge Subdistrict

Towns:
Dashi, Zheng'an, Zhong'an, Luoluobao, Changxingdian, Lüyang, Goubangzi, Liaotun, Qingduizi, Gaoshanzi, Zhaotun

Townships:
Futun Township, Baojia Township, Datun Township, Liujia Township, Wucheng Township, Liaocheng Township, Beizhen

Climate

References

External links

County-level divisions of Liaoning
Jinzhou